is a law firm in Tokyo, Japan.

The firm was formed February 1, 2003 upon the merger of Yuwa Partners, a firm specializing in international M&A (Mergers and acquisitions) and financial transactions, and the Law Department of Tokyo City Law & Tax Partners, a large domestic legal and tax practice. The firm expanded its offerings to include intellectual property by merging with patent litigation firm Ohba, Ozaki & Shimasue in September 2005. The firm doubled in size from 2005 to 2009, becoming a general legal practice. 

Asialaw ranks the firm as "highly recommended" in the fields of banking and finance, capital markets, corporate/M&A and investment funds.

External links 
Official website

References

Law firms of Japan
Law firms established in 2003